= Climatic changes =

Climatic changes may refer to:

- Global warming, climate change seen since the pre-industrial period
- Climate change (general concept), climate change throughout Earth's history
